The White Roses (German:Die weißen Rosen) is a 1916 German silent film directed by Urban Gad and starring Asta Nielsen, Ernst Hofmann and Max Landa.

Cast
 Asta Nielsen as Thilda Wardier  
 Ernst Hofmann as Graf Adam 
 Max Landa as Lord Kenley / Henry von Muiden  
 Mary Scheller as Gräfin de Rochard  
 Fred Immler as Mr. Morton  
 Herr Stengel as Graf Henry  
 Carl Auen as Oberkellner 
 Alfred Abel 
 Franz Arndt 
 Senta Eichstaedt 
 Ernst Fiedler-Spies 
 Karl Harbacher 
 Hanns Kräly 
 Eddie Seefeld 
 Magnus Stifter

References

Bibliography
 Jennifer M. Kapczynski & Michael D. Richardson. A New History of German Cinema.

External links

1916 films
Films of the German Empire
Films directed by Urban Gad
German silent feature films
German black-and-white films
1910s German films